Eero Johannes Suutari (born 27 December 1956) is a Finnish politician, who has represented the National Coalition Party in the Parliament of Finland since 2011. He was born in Sotkamo, and was elected to the Parliament from the Oulu constituency in 2011 with 3,495 votes and again in 2015 with 3,303 votes.

References

External links
 Home page of Eero Suutari 

1956 births
Living people
People from Sotkamo
National Coalition Party politicians
Members of the Parliament of Finland (2011–15)
Members of the Parliament of Finland (2015–19)